Loreto Garza (born May 23, 1962 in Sacramento, California) is an American former professional boxer and world champion at light welterweight.

Career

Amateur
Garza started boxing amateur at 18 years old and did it for three years. He won the Golden Gloves all three years, along with other big tournaments and was also on the U.S. boxing team.

Professional
Garza turned pro in 1982 at the age of 21. Working his way up the ranks, he got his opportunity. In 1988, Garza won the WBC Americas light welterweight championship with a spectacular first-round knockout of former world champion Harry Arroyo. Arroyo was knocked down three times in the fight. Later on that year, Garza knocked out former world champion Charlie Brown (other wise known as "Choo Choo" Brown) in four rounds.
   
In 1989, Garza, with a single right hand in the 7th round, knocked out former world champion Joe Manley. Manley was out cold. A couple of months later on August 12, 1989, Garza won a unanimous decision in a 12-round war to win the USBA championship over #1 ranked contender Frankie Warren; Garza fought the last five rounds with his left eye swelled shut. Many boxing annals argue that Garza vs. Warren should have been the fight of the year. 
   
On August 17, 1990, with only two weeks notice, Garza flew to Nice, France, and won the WBA light welterweight world title by majority decision over the reigning three-time world champion Juan Coggi. Garza looked sharp with a beautiful display of counter punching. He came back to his hometown of Sacramento and defended his world title against former five-time world champion Vinny Pazienza. Garza out-smarted and out-boxed Pazienza and had his face bloody and battered. Pazienza was frustrated throughout the fight and in the 11th round, Pazienza picked up Garza and tried to slam him in the ring, so the referee disqualified Pazienza. The following year, Garza lost the belt to Edwin Rosario via 3rd round TKO. Garza was down twice the first and twice in the third round.

Garza had three more fights after that and won them by knockout, and was promised another world title shot, but it seemed like all the world champions would duck when it came to Garza. He retired in 1993.

As a main event fighter, Garza also headlined two pay-per-view fights.

Professional boxing record

See also
List of world light-welterweight boxing champions

References

External links

1962 births
Living people
American male boxers
Boxers from Sacramento, California
World light-welterweight boxing champions
World Boxing Association champions